Farzad va Kahzad (also Romanized as Farzād va Kahzād, meaning "Farzad and Kahzad") is a village in Qaleh-ye Khvajeh Rural District, in the Central District of Andika County, Khuzestan Province, Iran. At the 2006 census, its population was 64, in 13 families.

References 

Populated places in Andika County